Maria Radu (born 5 November 1959) is a retired female middle and long-distance runner from Romania, who is best known for winning the women's 3000 metres at the 1983 Summer Universiade.

Achievements

Personal bests
1500 metres - 4:10.15 min (1983)
3000 metres - 9:30.37 min (1983)

External links

1959 births
Living people
Romanian female middle-distance runners
Romanian female long-distance runners
World Athletics Championships athletes for Romania
Universiade medalists in athletics (track and field)
Universiade gold medalists for Romania
Medalists at the 1981 Summer Universiade
Medalists at the 1983 Summer Universiade